Southern Leyte's 2nd legislative district will be the representation of the province of Southern Leyte in the Congress of the Philippines. Created in 2019 during the 17th Congress, the district will be represented in the lower house of the Congress through its second congressional district after the 2022 elections. The Second district is composed of municipalities of Sogod, Libagon, Liloan, San Francisco, Pintuyan, San Ricardo, Saint Bernard, Anahawan, San Juan, Hinunangan, Hinundayan and Silago.

Representation history

Election results

2022

See also 
Legislative districts of Southern Leyte

References 

 

Southern Leyte
Southern Leyte
Politics of Southern Leyte
Constituencies established in 2019